Lleida Pirineus ("Lleida Pyrenees") is an important railway station serving the city of Lleida in Catalonia, Spain. It is located between the neighbourhoods of Pardinyes and Rambla de Ferran. The first train services in Lleida date of 1860, but the station wasn't built until 1927, and it did not adopt its current official name until 2003, when it underwent an ambitious reform. As a transport hub connecting the interior of Spain with the Corredor Mediterráneo, it serves both broad gauge and standard gauge trains, operated by both Adif-Renfe and Ferrocarrils de la Generalitat de Catalunya. It is the terminus of several regional railway services centered in Aragon and Catalonia. It's also one of the stations on the Madrid–Barcelona high-speed rail line, and it was its north-eastern terminus until 2008.

Name
Although Lleida is not located in the Pyrenees mountain range, a part of the Catalan Pyrenees is located within the province of Lleida, and Lleida Pirineus station is the terminal station of FGC Lleida - La Pobla de Segur line that connects the city of Lleida with those mountains.

Rail services

Other transport
A bus station is currently projected immediately next to Lleida-Pirineus to replace the decaying one located in Carrer de Blondel.

References

External links
 Lleida Pirineus listing at Adif website
 Lleida Pirineus listing at Rodalies de Catalunya website
 Information and photos of the station at Trenscat.com 

Madrid–Barcelona high-speed rail line
Railway stations in Catalonia
Buildings and structures in Lleida
Railway stations in Spain opened in 1927
Rodalies de Catalunya stations
Transport in Lleida
Railway stations in Spain opened in 1860